GO Transit, formerly the Oshkosh Transit System, is the primary provider of mass transportation in Winnebago County, Wisconsin.

History

Transit service in Oshkosh began in June 1882 when the Oshkosh Street Railway Company began operating six horse-drawn cars on 4.5 miles of track. Over the years, this system was expanded and in 1897, electric streetcars replaced the horse-drawn cars. In the 1920's buses began to replace streetcars, and the last streetcar ran on May 31, 1930. In 1933, Oshkosh City Lines, Inc. assumed operation of urban buses in Oshkosh and in 1962 City Transit Lines took over operations.

City-owned Oshkosh Transit Service began in 1978, following the takeover of the struggling private City Transit Lines. Nine routes serve the city from Monday through Saturday. Since 1999, students at the University of Wisconsin-Oshkosh have been able to ride for free. Via Route 10, OTS serves Neenah, Wisconsin and connects with Valley Transit of Appleton, Wisconsin.

The name was changed from the Oshkosh Transit System on September 17, 2012.

Routes
1 Bowen/Hazel
2 Main/Jackson
3 FVTC/New York
4 Murdock/Logan
5 UWO/Westowne
6 Witzel/9th
7 Washburn/Koeller
8 20th/South Park
9 Oakwood
10 Neenah

Operating Schedule

GO Transit operating hours are from 6:15 AM to 6:45 PM Mondays through Saturdays. There is no service on Sunday.

In the past few years, the University of Wisconsin-Oshkosh has provided free late night transportation to supplement the service of the OTS called Titan Transit.

Facilities

Oshkosh Transit Center

The Oshkosh Transit Center is located in downtown Oshkosh, at 110 Pearl Avenue.  The transit center operates as the central transfer location and serves routes 1, 2, 3, 5, 6, 8 and 10 along with intercity buses, which serve Milwaukee, Green Bay and Wausau. The center consists of a long shelter with a metal roof. A large, enclosed heated section is located in the middle, with an enclosed, unheated section on each end. A bus lane on each side of the shelter allows ten 35-foot buses to line up at one time. Although the shelter was designed to meet federal and state guidelines for wheelchair accessibility, the passenger island was widened by four feet in 1991 to make it easier for disabled people to maneuver around support pillars.

The original transit center was located on the corner of Main and Waugoo where buses would line up along the street. The transit center has aged considerably and lacks crucial amenities. There are no designated public restrooms or fare kiosks. Therefore, as of 2021, GO Transit intends to make improvements to the shelter. Additions will include a supervisor's office, and a new break room for bus drivers in the employees' "comfort station," which is currently just two single-stall restrooms. Lighting and video surveillance upgrades will increase security, and updated and repainted pavement, along with improved landscaping and signs, also will improve accessibility. Plans also call for a small customer service window where riders could also purchase transport passes. However, that will only be staffed limited hours.

Other Transfer Points

 West Transfer Point - southside of Landmark Plaza Shopping Centre off South Washburn Street north of West 9th Avenue (Route 7 only)
 Neenah Transfer Center - 141-199 West Doty Avenue (small booth at the corner of South Church Street and West Doty Avenue)

Storage
 Transportation Department-Oshkosh Transit System Garage - 926 Dempsey Trail (off Witzel Avenue) is a bus garage and maintenance facility located south of Oshkosh Sports Complex

GO Plus Paratransit services

While GO Transit buses are low floor, accessible services are available to patrons who cannot use regular bus services: Cabulance and City Cab a contractors that provide GO Plus services with accessible vehicles (cars and special vans). Cabulance and Dial-A-Ride provide after hour bus and accessible services.
http://www.ci.oshkosh.wi.us/Transit/disabled_riders.htm

Funding

Fares account for 21% of the funding for GO Transit. The remaining come from local (25%), state  (24%) and federal (30%) sources.

Ridership

Transit Connections

Other transit operators in Wisconsin:
 Valley Transit (Wisconsin) Bus service serving the Appleton, Wisconsin/upper Fox Cities Area
 Fond du Lac Area Transit - in Fond du Lac, Wisconsin
 Greyhound Bus Lines
 Kobussen Buses Limited - chartered and coach operator
 Lamers Bus Lines - chartered and coach operator
 Oshkosh City Cab

See also
 Valley Transit
 Fond du Lac Area Transit
 List of intercity bus stops in Wisconsin
 List of bus transit systems in the United States

References

External links

Bus transportation in Wisconsin
Oshkosh, Wisconsin
Transportation in Winnebago County, Wisconsin